Bread is a group of staple foods.

Bread may also refer to:

Film and television
 Bread (1918 film), an American silent film
 Bread (1924 film), an American silent film
 Bread, a 1971 British film directed by Stanley Long
 Bread (1986 film), an Israeli Hebrew-language film
 Bread (TV series), a 1986–1991 British sitcom

Music
 Bread (band), an American soft rock band
 Bread (album), by Bread, 1969
 "Bread", a song by Todd Rundgren from Hermit of Mink Hollow, 1978

Other uses
 Bread (charity), a New Zealand charitable organisation
 "The Bread", a 1947 short story by Wolfgang Borchert
 "Bread", a poem by Patti Smith from her 1978 book Babel
 "Bread", a pseudonym used by David Katz, perpetrator of the 2018 Jacksonville Landing shooting
 "Bread", a nickname commonly used for money.